Chaetosargus is a genus of flies in the family Stratiomyidae.

Species
Chaetosargus hirticornis (Wiedemann, 1830)
Chaetosargus robustus (Brauer, 1882)
Chaetosargus secundus (Albuquerque, 1955)
Chaetosargus seitzi (Lindner, 1928)

References

Stratiomyidae
Brachycera genera
Diptera of South America